The Crainici is a right tributary of the river Motru in Romania. It discharges into the Motru in Dealu Viilor.

References

Rivers of Romania
Rivers of Mehedinți County